Lovecraft's Legacy was an anthology edited by Robert Weinberg and Martin H. Greenberg and published by Tor Books in 1990.

Contents
Introduction: an open letter to H. P. Lovecraft - Robert Bloch
A Secret of the Heart - Mort Castle
The Other Man - Ray Garton
Will - Graham Masterton
BIG "C" - Brian Lumley
Ugly - Gary Brandner
The Blade and the Claw - Hugh B. Cave
Soul Keeper - Joseph A. Citro
From the Papers of Helmut Hecker - Chet Williamson
Meryphillia - Brian McNaughton
Lord of the Land - Gene Wolfe
H.P.L - Gahan Wilson
The Order of Things Unknown - Edward Gorman
The Barrens - F. Paul Wilson

References
 Fantastic Fiction  
 The H. P. Lovecraft Archive
Brian Lumley's Web Site
 Unofficial F. Paul Wilson FAQ
The Bat Is My Brother: The Unofficial Robert Bloch Website
Mort Castle's Official Website
Official Website of Novelist Ray Garton
 Graham Masterton official website

Cthulhu Mythos anthologies
1990 anthologies
Tor Books books